Colin Mansfield Campbell (13 August 1872 – 3 April 1907) was an Australian rules footballer who played for Essendon Football Club in the Victorian Football League (VFL) and a first-class cricketer, representing Tasmania.

Family
The youngest son of Donald Campbell (1833–1907), and his second wife, Elizabeth Campbell (1825–1910), née Brumby, Colin Mansfield Campbell was born at Cressy, Tasmania on 13 August 1872.

Education
Educated at Horton College, Ross, Tasmania, he commenced his medical studies medicine at Queen's College at the University of Melbourne in 1891, and completed them in Scotland.

In 1903 he qualified for the Scottish Triple Conjoint Diploma; and, in so doing, he gained the following qualifications:
 Licentiate of the Royal College of Physicians of Edinburgh (L.R.C.P. Edin.).
 Licentiate of the Royal College of Surgeons of Edinburgh (L.R.C.P. Edin.).
 Licentiate of the Faculty of Physicians and Surgeons of Glasgow (L.F.P.S. Glas.).

Football
He attracted the Essendon (then VFA) club's attention during Essendon's 1890 Tasmanian tour match against a combined North-Eastern Football team. Immediately he arrived in Melbourne to commence his medical studies, he began his career with Essendon, kicking a goal, and one of its best players, in the first match of the 1891 season, against Footscary, on 2 May 1891.

Campbell played for Essendon in the Victorian Football Association (VFA) from 1891 to 1896, was its vice-captain in 1893, and was a member of its four premiership sides.

Although not playing at all during the home-and-away season, he played for Essendon (VFL) in the first two matches of the three-match inaugural VFL finals series on 21 August (against Geelong) at the Corio Oval, on 28 August 1897 (against Collingwood) at the MCG. He was unavailable for the third and final match, on 4 September 1897 (against Melbourne) at the Lake Oval, due to illness. On the basis of the team's victories in the round-robin competition, and because no Grand Final was needed, Essendon was awarded the 1897 premiership; and, so, due to the round-robin nature of the contest, Campbell was (and still is) legitimately recognized as "a premiership player".

He also played in 1898 and 1899, including the (losing) 1898 VFL Grand Final, in which he played at centre half-forward.

Cricket
Also in 1897, Campbell represented Tasmania in a first-class cricket match against Victoria at the North Tasmania Cricket Association Ground. He was dismissed in both innings by another debutant in James Giller, for scores of 0 and 17.

Whilst in England he played rugby and cricket, scoring over 1000 runs in a season for the Ryton Cricket Club.

Death
He died in 1907 of pneumonia, whilst working and living in Winlaton, England.

See also
 List of Tasmanian representative cricketers

Footnotes

References
 Maplestone, M., Flying Higher: History of the Essendon Football Club 1872–1996, Essendon Football Club, (Melbourne), 1996. 
 Ross, J. (ed), 100 Years of Australian Football 1897–1996: The Complete Story of the AFL, All the Big Stories, All the Great Pictures, All the Champions, Every AFL Season Reported, Viking, (Ringwood), 1996.

External links

 
 
 Cricinfo Profile: Colin Campbell

1872 births
1907 deaths
Australian rules footballers from Tasmania
Australian Rules footballers: place kick exponents
Essendon Football Club (VFA) players
Essendon Football Club players
Essendon Football Club Premiership players
Tasmanian Football Hall of Fame inductees
Australian cricketers
Tasmania cricketers
Cricketers from Tasmania
Deaths from pneumonia in England
University of Melbourne alumni
One-time VFL/AFL Premiership players